Zoroastrian prayer is performed for the worship of Ahura Mazda. The Zoroastrian place of worship is known as a fire temple.

See also
 Ashem Vohu
 Ahuna Vairya

References 

Zoroastrianism
Prayer